Percy Rowett White (1888–1918) was an Australian pioneer rugby league player. He played in the New South Wales Rugby League competition at the time of the code's Australian foundation in 1908, and won a premiership with Sydney's Eastern Suburbs club in 1912. He later served in World War I, and was killed by artillery fire in France in 1918.

Rugby League career
Born in the inner-city Sydney suburb of Paddington, White played 89 matches for the Eastern Suburbs club between 1908 and 1916. He played as a prop forward in East's 14-12 loss to South Sydney in rugby league's first premiership decider in season 1908. He was a squad member of the Easts sides who won premierships in 1911, 1912 and 1913, as well as the City Cup-winning sides of 1914, 1915 and 1916. White is recognised as Eastern Suburbs' 23rd player; his teammate Eddie White was his brother, while his father, John White, was one of the club's earliest presidents.

War service and death
White was one of many Australians to serve on the Western Front during the World War I. He was a driver with the 29th Company Australian Army Service Corps, whose base was in the Belgian town of Loker. He was aged 30 when he was hit by an artillery shell at an unknown location in 1918. He died of his wounds on 24 April 1918 at Villers-Bretonneux in northern France.

The following article appeared in the Sydney Morning Herald under the heading of "War Casualties" on 8 May 1918:
 White is buried at Daours Communal Cemetery Extension in France. His name is commemorated on panel 181 in the Australian War Memorial.

References

Bibliography

Whiticker, Alan and Hudson, Glen (2006). The Encyclopedia of Rugby League Players. Sydney: Gavin Allen Publishing.

Australian rugby league players
Sydney Roosters players
Australian military personnel killed in World War I
1918 deaths
1888 births
Rugby league players from Sydney
Rugby league props
Date of birth missing
Date of death missing